USS Newport (LST-1179) was the third ship of the United States Navy (USN) to bear the name of the Rhode Island city. Her ability to adjust her draft, accompanied by her unique bow-ramp design, helped bring a new degree of responsiveness to the amphibious fleet. The ship was launched in 1968 and entered service with the USN in 1969. Assigned to the United States Atlantic Fleet for the entirety of her career, Newport made deployments to the Mediterranean and Caribbean Seas. The vessel was taken out of service in 1992 and laid up until 2001.

In 2001, the ship was sold to the Mexican Navy and initially renamed ARM Sonora before becoming ARM Rio Papaloapan (or just ARM Papaloapan for short). In Mexican service, the LST has participated in humanitarian missions in the aftermath of the hurricanes Katrina and Sandy and taken part in multi-national naval exercises.

Description
However, the traditional bow door form for LSTs would not be capable. Therefore, the designers of the Newport class came up with a design of a traditional ship hull with a  aluminum ramp slung over the bow supported by two derrick arms. This made the Newport class the first to depart from the standard LST design that had been developed in early World War II.

Newport was fitted with six General Motors 16-645-ES diesel engines turning two shafts, three to each shaft. The ship was also equipped with a bow thruster to allow for better maneuvering near causeways and to hold position while offshore during the unloading of amphibious vehicles.

The Newport class were larger and faster than previous LSTs and were able to transport tanks, heavy vehicles and engineer groups and supplies that were too large for helicopters or smaller landing craft to carry. The LSTs have a ramp forward of the superstructure that connects the lower tank deck with the main deck and a passage large enough to allow access to the parking area amidships. The vessels are also equipped with a stern gate to allow the unloading of amphibious vehicles directly into the water or to unload onto a utility landing craft (LCU) or pier. At either end of the tank deck there is a  turntable that permits vehicles to turn around without having to reverse. The vessels also have davits for four vehicle and personnel landing craft (LCVPs) and could carry four pontoon causeway sections along the sides of the hull.

Newport was initially armed with four Mark 33 /50 caliber guns in two twin turrets. The vessel was equipped with two Mk 63 gun control fire systems (GCFS) for the 3-inch guns, but these were removed in 1977–1978. The ship also had SPS-10 surface search radar. Atop the stern gate, the vessels mounted a helicopter deck. They had a maximum complement of 213 including 11 officers.

Construction and career

United States Navy service

The vessel was ordered as part of Fiscal Year 1965 from the Philadelphia Naval Shipyard of Philadelphia, Pennsylvania. The ship's keel was laid down on 1 November 1966 and the vessel was launched on 3 February 1968, sponsored by Nuella Pell, wife of Rhode Island Senator Claiborne Pell. Newport, named for the city in Rhode Island, was commissioned into the United States Navy on 7 June 1969.

Upon entering service, Newport was assigned to the Atlantic Fleet as part of the amphibious force. The vessel was deployed in the Mediterranean and Caribbean Seas along with training operations along the United States East Coast. The development of the landing craft air cushion, which allowed the United States Navy to launch over-the-horizon amphibious landings, made the Newport class obsolete. USS Newport was decommissioned on 1 October 1992.

Mexican Navy service

After several years laid up Newport was sold to the Mexican Navy on 18 January 2001 as part of the Security Assistance Program in a cash sale and renamed Sonora (A-04). On 23 May 2001, the vessel joined the Mexican Navy and was renamed ARM Rio Papaloapan or Papaloapan (A 411). The vessel was stricken from the United States Naval Vessel Register on 13 July 2001.

In late 2005, ARM Papaloapan brought aid and supplies to Mississippi after Hurricane Katrina hit the state, with her crew taking part in cleanup efforts near Biloxi. In January 2010, she was deployed with 5,000 tons of cargo in a humanitarian mission to Haiti. In November 2012, she was sent to Cuba with supplies to help the victims of Hurricane Sandy after the hurricane caused severe damage to the island.

In 2015, Papaloapan participated in the multi-national naval exercise UNITAS.
In 2017, the ship took part in the multi-national naval exercise Bold Alligator on the US East Coast. In 2018, the ship took part in another multi-national naval exercise, Panamax 2018, off the coast of the United States.

Citations

References

External links

 navsource.org: USS Newport
 

Newport-class tank landing ships
Ships built in Philadelphia
1968 ships
Cold War amphibious warfare vessels of the United States
Newport-class tank landing ships of the Mexican Navy
Amphibious warfare vessels of Mexico
2010 Haiti earthquake relief